Hasanabad-e Qarah Darband (also Romanized as Ḩasanābād-e Qarah Darband; also known as Ḩasanābād, Qarah Darband, and Qeshlāq-e Ḩasanābād) is a village in Hakimabad Rural District, in the Central District of Zarandieh County, Markazi Province, Iran. At the 2006 census, its population was 51, in 10 families.

References 

Populated places in Zarandieh County